Compline is one of the Christian canonical hours.

Compline may also refer to:

 Compline (composition), a 1996 chamber music piece by Christopher Rouse
 Compline Choir, a choral group in Seattle, Washington, US
 "Compline", a poem in the 1955 Horae Canonicae series by W. H. Auden